Victoria Louise Lemieux (born 27 March 1963) is a Canadian specialist in records management and Associate Professor of Archival Studies at the University of British Columbia (UBC). She is known for her research into financial information management, risk mitigation including using blockchain technology in risk reduction.

Early years and education
Victoria Louise Lemieux (née Bryans) was born in Toronto in 1963.
She obtained a master's degree in Archival Studies from the University of British Columbia around 1985, and began a career as a records and information management professional.
In 2002 she obtained a doctorate from University College London with a thesis that examined information-related causes of the Jamaican Financial Crisis of 1996–1997.
She became a Certified Information Systems Security Professional (CISSP) in 2005.

Career

City of Edmonton
Lemieux was director of information services for the City of Edmonton, where she improved records management in the City Clerk's Office. 
She was promoted to Director of Corporate Records and Information Services, where she was responsible for all the city's records.

University of the West Indies
In September 1993 Lemieux became the campus records manager at the University of the West Indies (UWI).
In 1997 she was promoted to University Archivist at the UWI, and was responsible for modernizing the registry system on three campuses.
She also expanded the University's records management certificate program to train public sector workers throughout the Caribbean region.
She provided consulting on improving efficiency and accountability of records management in several English-speaking Caribbean countries.
She left UWI in July 2001.

World Bank
Lemieux was a consultant at the World Bank from July 2001 to September 2002.
She audited the human resources and payroll systems of governments in Uttar Pradesh (India), Tanzania, Burkina Faso and Chile.
She returned to the World Bank as a senior public sector specialist from July 2014 to June 2016, on leave from the University of British Columbia.
She worked on supporting economic and social development through  transparency and information management, and was a leader of several big data analytics projects.
Lemieux led the imProvenance Group funded by the World Bank.
She advised the World Bank, associated international development agencies and the bank's client developing countries on transparency and information management.

Credit Suisse
After completing her doctorate at UCL in 2002 Lemieux joined the global investment bank Credit Suisse.
She was vice president, IT risk management.
In 2007 she was responsible for the information technology risk and security components of a major project to outsource the bank's network infrastructure.
In this project she applied her pioneering theory of risk-based records management.

Consultant
In 2008 Lemieux founded CIFER, the Centre for the Investigation of Financial Electronic Records.
After the Financial crisis of 2007–2008 she worked with the Office of Financial Research of the United States Department of the Treasury to introduce records management concepts to financial regulators and to promote transparency in the global financial system.
She was Canadian representative to the TC68 Technical Committee on Financial Services of the International Organization for Standardization (ISO).
She has also served as a consultant to the United Nations and the Commonwealth Secretariat.

University of British Columbia
From July 2012 to July 2014 Lemieux was director of the Media & Graphics Interdisciplinary Centre (MAGIC) at the University of British Columbia (UBC), where she established the Digital Salon for use by the Digital Humanities.
In April 2014 she became an Associate Professor in Archival Science at the University of British Columbia (UBC).
She contributed to design of courses on Information Technology Security, Information Assurance and Risk Management; Financial Records; and Information Visualization and Visual Analytics.

After returning from two years leave at the World Bank, in 2016 Lemieux founded a cross-discipline research cluster into blockchain technology, Blockchain@UBC.
In 2019 she was awarded $1,600,000 by Canada's Natural Sciences and Engineering Research Council (NSERC) for a five-year project to train up to 139 students at the masters and PhD levels in different aspects of blockchain and distributed ledger technology.
Fifteen industry partners, including Boehringer Ingelheim and Mitacs, also provided support.
The program was to start in January 2020 and would cover the areas of health and wellness, clean energy, regulatory technology and issues for indigenous residents.

Research and innovation
Lemieux views archival science as an academic discipline that is relevant to other disciplines, as opposed to viewing it as a professional field.
She embraces tools and approaches from ontology, visual analytics, graph theory, information systems and philosophy to describe the internal structure of archive records, their provenance and how they represent networks.
Lemieux and others such as Kenneth Thibodeau see graph theory and semantic technology as fundamental to the theory of archives and records management.

In 2010 Lemieux studied literature on records and information risk, looking into aspects such as the types of risk discussed most often, approaches to the subject and evolution of views over time.
She reviewed several hundred articles on risk associated with archives and records.
Topics included types of risk to records, risks caused by records, risks if the profession does not adapt to new record formats, risks in the way in which archival functions are performed and techniques for mitigating risk.
Lemieux has developed a tool to assess organizational and human behavioural risk when implementing EDRM systems.

As of 2020 she was investigating availability of trustworthy records, particularly financial records.
She was interested in how the risks to records availability affect public accountability and transparency, financial stability and human rights.
She was particularly interested in blockchain record keeping systems.
She is a member of the International Organization for Standardization (ISO) Technical Committee 307 on Blockchains and Distributed Ledger Technology.

Recognition
Awards include:
 2001 W. Kaye Lamb Best Paper Award
 2009 Peter Wall Institute for Advanced Studies Early Career Scholar Award
 2011 Emerald Literati Best Paper Award
 2015 Emmett Leahy Award for outstanding contributions to the records profession
 2015 World Bank Big Data Innovation Award

Publications

Notes

Sources

1963 births
Living people
Canadian archivists
Academic staff of the University of British Columbia